Fukutomi (written: 福冨 or 福富) may refer to:

 (born 1950), Japanese anime director
, former town in Kamo District, Hiroshima Prefecture, Japan

Japanese-language surnames